The speed prior is a complexity measure similar to Kolmogorov complexity, except that it is based on computation speed as well as program
length.
The speed prior complexity of a program is its size in bits plus the logarithm of the maximum time we are willing to run it to get a prediction.

When compared to traditional measures, use of the Speed
Prior has the disadvantage of leading to less optimal predictions, and
the advantage of providing computable predictions.

See also 

 Computational complexity theory
 Inductive inference
 Minimum message length
 Minimum description length

References

External links 

Speed Prior web site

Bayesian statistics